Fransérgio may refer to:

Fransérgio Barbosa (born 1990), known as Fransérgio, a Brazilian football player 
Fransérgio Bastos (born 1980), known as Fransérgio, a Brazilian football player 
Francisco Sérgio García (born 1948), known as Fransérgio, a Brazilian basketball player